

Chemistry
 n-, a lowercase prefix in chemistry denoting the straight-chain form of an open-chain compound in contrast to its branched isomer
 N-, an uppercase prefix in chemistry denoting that the substituent is bonded to the nitrogen, as in amines

Mathematics, science and technology
The italicized letter n is used in mathematics to denote an arbitrary number (usually a non-negative integer).
 n-ary associativity
 n-ary code
 n-ary group
 n-back
 n-body problem
 n-category
 n-category number
 n-connected space
 n-curve
 n-dimensional space
 n-dimensional sequential move puzzle
 n-electron valence state perturbation theory (NEVPT)
 n-entity
 n-flake
 n-gram
 n-group
 n-monoid
 n-player game
 n-skeleton
 n-slit interferometer
 n-slit interferometric equation
 n-sphere
 n-vector
 n-vector model

Prefixes